The 2013 Goody's Headache Relief Shot 500 was a NASCAR Sprint Cup Series stock car race that was held on October 27, 2013, at Martinsville Speedway in Ridgeway, Virginia. Contested over 500 laps on the 0.526-mile (0.847 km) oval, it was the thirty-third race of the 2013 Sprint Cup Series season, as well as the seventh race in the ten-race Chase for the Sprint Cup, which ends the season. Jeff Gordon of Hendrick Motorsports won the race, his first and only win of the season, breaking a 33-race winless streak, while Matt Kenseth finished second and Clint Bowyer finished third.

Report

Background
Coming into the race, Jimmie Johnson was the chosen by the pundits to be the favorite along with Kyle Busch, Kasey Kahne and Matt Kenseth. Ten drivers were depicted as the underdogs for this race including Danica Patrick, Juan Pablo Montoya, Marcos Ambrose and Paul Menard.

Johnson had the advantage in the Sprint Cup Series championship points while Kyle Busch and Jeff Gordon were within easy striking distance of taking the championship lead away from him.

Qualifying results

Race
David Ragan blew his engine on lap 109, with Kyle Larson having a similar incident on lap 160. Tony Raines developed problems with his brakes on lap 220 while Dave Blaney was involved in a terminal crash on lap 357. The final DNF of the race came from David Reutimann, who had troubles with his rear gear on lap 451 and had to leave the race prematurely.

Approximately 22% of the race was held under a caution flag while the average green flag run was nearly 22 laps. Most of the yellow flags in this race were caused by accidents, debris and cars spinning dangerously out of control.

Jeff Burton, Greg Biffle, Jeff Gordon, Matt Kenseth and Jimmie Johnson had the fastest pit crews in the race, with the average time on pit road being 41 seconds.

There were seven total penalties during the course of the race. Ricky Stenhouse Jr. was penalized twice for too many men over the wall. Ken Schrader, and Kasey Kahne were also penalized for too many men over the wall. Ryan Newman was penalized for Lug nut(s) not installed, and Ken Schrader and David Reutimann were both penalized for too fast entering pits.

Results

Standings after the race

Drivers' Championship standings

Note: Only the first thirteen positions are included for the driver standings.

References

Goody's Headache Relief Shot 500
Goody's Headache Relief Shot 500
Goody's Headache Relief Shot 500
NASCAR races at Martinsville Speedway